Thomas Howard, 1st Viscount Howard of Bindon (c. 1520 – 1582), was an English peer and politician. He was the youngest son of Thomas Howard, 3rd Duke of Norfolk and Lady Elizabeth Stafford. He served as Custos Rotulorum of Dorset and Vice-Admiral of Dorset. In 1559, he was raised to the peerage as Viscount Howard of Bindon by Queen Elizabeth I of England, taking the title from Bindon Abbey in Dorset, many of whose former lands he held. Thomas had eight children by three wives.

By Elizabeth Marney, daughter and co-heir of John Marney, 2nd Baron Marney (first wife):
Henry Howard, 2nd Viscount Howard of Bindon
Thomas Howard, 3rd Viscount Howard of Bindon
Francis Howard
Giles Howard
Grace Howard

By Gertrude Lyte (second wife):
Charles Howard
Anne Howard, who married firstly Sir William Thornhurst, their son Gifford Thornhurst married Susanna Temple, and secondly, John Turberville of Woolbridge.

By Mabel Burton, daughter of Nicholas Burton (third wife):
Frances Howard, who married as her second husband, Edward Seymour, 1st Earl of Hertford, and as her third husband, Ludovic Stewart, 2nd Duke of Lennox and 1st Duke of Richmond.

References

|-

1520s births
1582 deaths
16th-century English nobility
Thomas Howard, 1st Viscount Howard of Bindon
Year of birth uncertain
Younger sons of dukes
Viscounts Howard of Bindon
Peers of England created by Elizabeth I